Dailymotion is a French video-sharing technology platform owned by Vivendi. North American launch partners included Vice Media, Bloomberg and Hearst Digital Media. It is among the earliest known platforms to support HD (720p) resolution video. Dailymotion is available worldwide in 183 languages and 43 localised versions featuring local home pages and local content.

History 

In March 2005, Benjamin Bejbaum and Olivier Poitrey founded the website, pooling €6,000 (US$9,271) from six individuals to start it. In September 2006, Dailymotion raised funds in collaboration with Atlas Ventures and Partech International. They raised €7 million, which was considered to be the most funds raised in 2006 from the French Web 2.0. In 2007 Dailymotion created ASIC, together with other companies in the sector.

Dailymotion supports a high-definition video resolution of 720p since February 2008, making it one of the earliest known HD video platforms.

October 2009, the French government invested in Dailymotion through the Strategic Investment Fund. On 25 January 2011, Orange acquired a 49% stake in Dailymotion for €62 million, valuing the company at €120 million.

On 10 January 2013, Orange bought the remaining 51% for €61 million. On or about 2 May 2013, the French government blocked Yahoo's acquisition of a majority stake in Dailymotion.

On 25 February 2014, Orange revealed it was in discussions with Microsoft about a deal that could see Dailymotion extend into the US market. In an interview with a local television station in Barcelona Stéphane Richard, CEO of Orange, said there was "great hope" an agreement would be reached. Any deal would see Orange retain majority ownership of Dailymotion. Richard said his company was in talks with other potential partners as well with a view to expanding Dailymotion's international appeal, but said discussions with others were more in relation to content.

In 2015, Vivendi purchased an 80% stake in Dailymotion from Orange S.A. Vivendi increased its ownership to 90% that September.

In September 2020, Dailymotion partnered with Mi Video, the global video app developed by Xiaomi. The partnership will help Mi Video to increase its engagement with its audience and continue its growth momentum. Access to Dailymotion's global and regional music, entertainment, sports and news catalogues will be provided to Mi Video users.

The comment section was removed completely approximately in 2018, and the view counter was removed in mid-2021.
On June 1 to 2, 2022, the picture-in-picture view mode which allowed browsing the site while playing a video in the lower-right corner of the screen was removed.

Global locations 
The head office is located in the Immeuble Horizons 17 in the 17th arrondissement of Paris. Dailymotion began expanding its physical presence internationally in 2007, when the company opened its office in New York City. Since then, Dailymotion offices have been opened in London (2009), San Francisco (2011), Singapore (2014) and Abidjan (2016).

Blocking of Dailymotion 
Dailymotion was banned in India in May 2012, but in the following month India unblocked access to video- and file-sharing sites including Dailymotion. The Madras High Court changed its earlier order, explaining that only specific URLs carrying illegally copied content should be blocked, not entire websites. Dailymotion was again banned in India in December 2014, due to Government concerns that the site might be hosting videos pertaining to criticism of Indian rule in Kashmir. On 31 December 2014, however, Dailymotion was again unblocked in India.

Dailymotion has been banned in Kazakhstan since August 2011.

In 2017, Dailymotion was blocked in Russia for repeated violations of Russian copyright law.

Dailymotion also has been blocked in China and North Korea.

Copyright cases 
In June 2007, Dailymotion was found liable for copyright infringement by a Paris High Court. The judges held that Dailymotion is a hosting provider, and not a publisher, but that it must be held liable for copyright infringement, as it was aware of the presence of illegal content on its site. Such illegal content may be copyrighted material uploaded to Dailymotion by its users. The judges held that Dailymotion was aware that illegal videos were put online on its site, and that it must therefore be held liable for the acts of copyright infringement, since it deliberately furnished the users with the means to commit the acts of infringement.

In December 2014, Dailymotion was fined €1.3 million. The Paris Court of Appeal found that the site had infringed the copyright of French television station TF1 and news channel LCI. The court ruled that Dailymotion had failed to take action against users illegally posting TF1 content online.

According to Guillaume Clément, Chief Product & Technology Officer, as of 2017 the company employs a combination of human curation and automated tools to ensure copyright holder rights are protected within the destination, and it is able to remove questionable or illegal content within two hours.

Dailymotion has been permanently blocked in Russia since January 2017, because the Moscow City Court ruled that the site was repeatedly violating Russia's copyright law by providing access to illegal TV content.

See also 

 Comparison of video hosting services

References

External links 

 

Advertising video on demand
Companies based in Paris
French brands
Internet properties established in 2005
IOS software
Online companies of France
PlayStation 4 software
Social networking services
Video hosting
Vivendi subsidiaries
Xbox One software
2005 establishments in France
2015 mergers and acquisitions
Copyright infringement